Viktor Troicki and Nenad Zimonjić were the defending champions, but lost in the first round to Robin Haase and Matwé Middelkoop.

Haase and Middelkoop went on to win the title, defeating Nikola Mektić and Alexander Peya in the final, 5–7, 6–4, [10–4].

Seeds

Draw

Draw

References
 Main Draw

Sofia Open
Sofia Open